Ronald Van Avermaet (born 5 January 1959) is a Belgian former cyclist. He competed in the individual road race event at the 1980 Summer Olympics.

He is the father of Greg Van Avermaet, who won the men's road race at the 2016 Summer Olympics.

References

External links
 

1959 births
Living people
Belgian male cyclists
Olympic cyclists of Belgium
Cyclists at the 1980 Summer Olympics
People from Hamme
Cyclists from East Flanders